Yeti Airlines Pvt. Ltd. is an airline based in Kathmandu, Nepal. The airline was established in May 1998 and received its air operator's certificate on 17 August 1998. Since 2019, Yeti Airlines is the first carbon neutral airline in Nepal and South Asia. It is the parent company of Tara Air. As of 2021, Yeti Airlines was the second-largest domestic carrier in Nepal, after Buddha Air.

History 
Yeti Airlines was established by Ang Tshering Sherpa in May 1998 and received its Air Operators Certificate on 17 August 1998. It started operations with two de Havilland Canada DHC-6 Twin Otters.

In 2009, Yeti Airlines established the subsidiary Tara Air to which it outsourced its STOL operations to airports in the rural and mountainous airports in Nepal and transferred its respective aircraft, DHC-6 Twin Otters and Dornier 228s to Tara Air.

Yeti Airlines and Tara Air combine to form the largest domestic airline in Nepal; the group has more than 60% of the total market share as of January 2008. Together, Yeti Airlines and Tara Air have the widest domestic flight network of any Nepali airline and fly to most destinations in Nepal.

International operations 
In 2007, Yeti Airlines launched Fly Yeti as a joint venture with Air Arabia. Due to political uncertainty, the airline ceased its operations in 2008.

In 2013, the European Commission banned all Nepalese airlines from entering the European airspace. This restriction is still in place as of June 2021 and specifically also names Yeti Airlines.

In 2014, Yeti Airlines launched Himalaya Airlines, another international joint venture, this time with Chinese Tibet Airlines.

Yeti World
The parent company of Yeti Airlines, Yeti World, also encompasses other touristic ventures, including hotels and resorts and further airline companies, namely Air Dynasty and Altitude Air.

In December 2019, Yeti World made headlines, as it was involved in a corruption case around Prime Minister K.P. Oli.

Destinations 
Yeti Airlines offers scheduled flights to the following destinations (as of February 2023): 

Yeti Airlines also operates the one-hour-long Everest Express scheduled mountain sightseeing flights from Kathmandu to Mount Everest and Annapurna Express mountain sightseeing flights from Pokhara to Annapurna Massif.

Codeshare agreements
Yeti Airlines has a codeshare agreement with its subsidiary Tara Air.

Fleet

Current fleet
The Yeti Airlines fleet consists of these aircraft (as of January 2023):

Former fleet
Yeti Airlines also formerly operated these types of aircraft:

Accidents and incidents 

 25 May 2004 – Yeti Airlines Flight 117: A Yeti Airlines DHC-6 Twin Otter (registration 9N-AFD) cargo flight crashed into a hill on approach to Lukla. All three crew members were killed.
 21 June 2006 – 2006 Yeti Airlines Twin Otter Crash: A DHC-6 Twin Otter registered as 9N-AEQ was destroyed in a rice paddy on approach to Jumla, killing all six passengers and the crew of three.
 8 October 2008 – Yeti Airlines Flight 101: A DHC-6 was destroyed upon landing at Lukla, killing all 18 passengers and two of the three crew. The captain was the only survivor.
 24 September 2016 – Yeti Airlines Flight 893: A BAe Jetstream 41 registration 9N-AIB en route from Kathmandu to Bhairahawa overran the runway while landing at Gautam Buddha Airport. None of the 29 passengers or crew of three were hurt, but the aircraft was damaged beyond repair.
 12 July 2019 –  Yeti Airlines Flight 422: An ATR 72-500 (registration 9N-AMM) en route from Nepalgunj Airport to Tribhuvan International Airport suffered a runway excursion while landing. All 68 people on board, including the crew of four, evacuated the aircraft safely. Two of them received minor injuries and were taken to the hospital. A wet runway during the rainy season could have been the cause.
 29 July 2022 –  Yeti Airlines Flight 672: An ATR 72-500 (registration 9N-ANG) en route from the Pokhara International Airport to Tribhuvan International Airport with 45 people on board, was climbing out of Pokhara when the left hand engine (PW127) failed prompting the crew to shut the engine down and return to Pokhara for a safe landing about 6 minutes after departure. The airport reported the left hand engine failed immediately after the aircraft became airborne.
 15 January 2023 – Yeti Airlines Flight 691: Yeti Airlines ATR 72-500 (registration 9N-ANC) en route from Tribhuvan International Airport to Pokhara International Airport crashed near Gharipatan, Pokhara. No one survived among the 68 passengers and four crew members on board, making it the deadliest plane crash in Nepal since 1992.

Trivia
Yeti Airlines is the current shirt sponsor of Kathmandu-based football club Himalayan Sherpa Club, who currently play in Nepal's highest football league, the Martyr's Memorial A-Division League.

References

External links

 

1998 establishments in Nepal
Airlines banned in the European Union
Airlines established in 1998
Airlines of Nepal